Breaking bread may refer to:

 The Christian Eucharist
 Fraction (religion), the practice of breaking the sacramental bread during the Eucharist

Entertainment
 Breakin' Bread, a 1974 album by The J.B.'s
 "Breaking Bread", a song by Del Amitri from the 1985 album Del Amitri
 "Breaking Bread", a song by Johnny Cash from the 2003 album Unearthed
 "Breaking Bread", a song by Matmos from the 2019 album Plastic Anniversary
 "Breaking Bread", an episode of the TV series Pie in the Sky
 "Breaking Bread", an episode of the TV series Touched by an Angel
 "Breaking Bread", an episode of the TV series Traffic Light

Other uses
 Fractio Panis (Breaking of the Bread), a fresco in the Catacomb of Priscilla, Rome
 Breaking Bread: A Baker's Journey Home in 75 Recipes, a 2017 book by baker Martin Philip

See also
 Kagami biraki, a ritual in Japanese culture